Nicușor Dan (born 20 December 1969) is a Romanian activist, mathematician, former member of the Chamber of Deputies of Romania as well as former founder and leader of the Romanian political party Save Romania Union (USR). He is currently serving as the Mayor of Bucharest following the 2020 Romanian local elections.

Biography
Born in Făgăraș, Brașov County, he attended the Radu Negru High School in his native city. He won first prizes in the International Mathematical Olympiads in 1987 and 1988 with perfect scores. Dan moved to Bucharest at the age of 18 and began studying mathematics at the University of Bucharest.

In 1992, he moved to France to continue studying mathematics: he followed the courses of the École Normale Supérieure, one of the most prestigious French grande écoles, where he gained a master's degree. He returned to Bucharest that year, giving as reasons for his return his inadaptation to the French culture and the desire to change Romania.

, he was a professor of mathematics at the institute.

Activism
In 1998, Dan founded Asociația "Tinerii pentru Acțiune Civică" ("Young People for Civic Action" Association), for which he wanted to gather a thousand young people who wanted to change Romania, which was his stated goal for returning to the country. Despite failing in its goals, the association did organize two forums for young people who studied abroad, in 2000 and 2002, to which a few hundred people participated. As result of these forums, the "Ad Astra" Association of Romanian researchers was created in 2000.

Save Bucharest Association
 

Dan founded the Asociația "Salvați Bucureștiul" ("Save Bucharest" Association) in 2006 as a reaction to the demolition of architectural heritage houses and the building of high-rise buildings in protected Bucharest neighborhoods, as well as the diminishing number of green space areas in Bucharest.

In March 2008, the association published the "Bucharest, an urbanistic disaster" Report, which discussed Bucharest's problems and ways to overcome them. In the same year, during the elections, together with other NGOs, the association drafted a Pact for Bucharest, which was signed by all the candidates for mayor of Bucharest. On April Fools' Day in 2012, Dan published a list of 100 electoral promises made by elected mayor of Bucharest Sorin Oprescu which were not kept, including the "Pact for Bucharest".

The association was involved in many trials, winning 23 trials against the local authorities of Bucharest. Among them are the cancellation of a project which would have built a water park on 7 hectares of Tineretului Park, saving from demolition a number of heritage buildings on Șoseaua Kiseleff no. 45, and the cancelation of a project which would have built a glass building on top of Palatul Știrbei on Calea Victoriei.

The association was also able to push some changes in 2009 to the urban planning law.

Political career

2012 local elections 
Nicușor Dan announced his candidacy for Mayor of Bucharest in November 2011 at a café on Arthur Verona street, with just a few guests, among which Theodor Paleologu, a historian and Member of Parliament.

For gathering the 36,000 signatures needed for his candidacy, having the backing of no party, he relied on a network of volunteers organized on Facebook. On 22 April, 15 bands and musicians performed pro-bono at Arenele Romane for Dan's campaign in order to help him gather the signatures. During the 12-hour-long concert, volunteers gathered 4,000 signatures.<ref>Mircea Toma, "Experiența Nicușor Dan", B-24-FUN", 28 April 2012.</ref>

Political positions and program
Among his proposed projects are the creation of a light rail infrastructure over the existing rail lines in Bucharest, creating an infrastructure for prioritizing public transport over other traffic in intersections, consolidating buildings that are likely to be affected by earthquakes, protecting the urban green space and clearing illegal buildings from parks.

Dan argues that it is important to incentivize young people to stay in the city, by making it a regional hub in IT, creative industries and higher education, and attracting investors and skilled people from across the region."Independentul Nicușor Dan și-a depus candidatura la Primăria Capitalei", Evenimentul Zilei, 30 April 2012.

Support and opinions on his candidacy

He received support from Andrei Pleșu, who argued that Dan is the only one of the candidates who is interested in the architecture of Bucharest and does not support any utopian initiatives. He also received support from political scientist and Member of the European Parliament Cristian Preda.

Dan gained the support of some journalists who wrote about him in op-eds from several newspapers: Andrei Crăciun of Adevărul saw in him "a Don Quijote untouched by the vulgar lard of undeserved riches" and "a person who works against the system". Florin Negruțiu, the editor-in-chief of Gândul thought he is an "atypical candidate" for Bucharest, the model candidate of the intellectuals; nevertheless, the journalist did not see any chances that Dan would become mayor, because he is "too serious" a candidate, and unlikely to appeal to the masses. Neculai Constantin Munteanu from Radio Free Europe'' wrote that he supports Dan for his unselfish way of caring about Bucharest and that his opponents are "comedians", for which one can "admire the imposture, ludicrousness, and incompetence".

2016 local elections
Having registered Save Bucharest Union (USB) as a political party in 2015, Nicușor Dan ran again for Mayor of Bucharest in 2016. This time, the elections were held in a single round. He gained 30,52% of the total votes, losing to the socialist candidate, Gabriela Firea, who gained 42,97% of the total votes.

In the election, Dan managed to attract the young electorate, with over half of his voters being under the age of 40. Some of USB's candidates for sector mayor have also performed well in their respective races, proving USB's viability as a future political force.

Save Romania Union 

Wanting to capitalize on the momentum that saw him gain a third of the votes in the local elections, Dan announced shortly after the 2016 local election that the Save Bucharest Union will change its name to Save Romania Union (USR), shifting its focus to a national stage. He also announced plans for the new party to enter the Parliamentary elections of that year.

With Nicușor Dan at the top of the candidate list, USR gained 8.92% of the vote in the Senate race and 8.87% in the Chamber of Deputies, which made them the third largest party in Romania. The result also meant that Dan became a member of the Chamber of Deputies.

Departure from USR 
In 2017, anti-same-sex pressure group Coaliția pentru Familie managed to raise the necessary number of signatures to organize a referendum that would change the part of the Romanian Constitution dealing with marriage, with the hope of redefining it as "between a man and a woman". This created a rift within USR, between the progressive wing, who wanted USR to become the only Parliamentary party to oppose the initiative, and Nicușor Dan, who believed USR should not get involved in the debate and that the party should remain open for both progressives and conservatives. An internal referendum within the party followed, in which 52,7% of members voted to position the party against the Constitutional initiative, which triggered Dan to resign from the party on 1 June 2017. As explanation for his opposition to the National Council vote he cited religious matters, the dangers of deviating from the main party issue, which is the fight against corruption and his refusal to belong to a party that defines itself as a party of civil liberties.

Independent 
After his resignation from USR, Nicușor Dan continued to serve as a member of the Chamber of Deputies as an independent.

Due to a quirk in the Romanian electoral law, USR required his signature when they attempted to legally register their alliance with the Freedom, Unity and Solidarity Party (PLUS). In order to help his former party, in March 2019 Dan briefly rejoined USR as a common member, gave the necessary signature and then resigned for a second time.

2020 local elections

In May 2019, he announced his plans to once again run for Mayor of Bucharest, as an independent. Dan mentioned that while he hopes that his candidacy will be supported by the rest of the opposition parties, he will not run against a different common candidate, unwilling to split the vote of the opposition.

He was ultimately supported by both USR and the National Liberal Party (PNL). With 95% of votes counted, partial results suggested that he won the mayoral election with 42.8% of votes. Shortly afterwards exit polls  showed him winning the race, he announced victory. On 5 October 2020 the Central Electoral Bureau confirmed his status as the new Mayor of Bucharest, winning the elections with a majority of 42.81% against Gabriela Firea (37.97%), the former Mayor.

Electoral history

Mayor of Bucharest

Controversy 
In an article published in 2000 in the conservative weekly Dilema, Nicușor Dan stated that "I am against the acceptance of homosexual behavior in public spaces, in Romania. I believe this to be an attack against traditional values and therefore, my legitimate collective identity". The statement kept resurfacing after his political career took off, particularly during his much-publicized departure from USR. Dan distanced himself from his previous statements on several occasions, claiming that he is not homophobic and that his opinion on the matter has changed considerably in the intervening years.

Personal life 
Nicușor Dan lives with his long-time girlfriend, Mirabela, an executive for Renault. They became the parents in May 2016 of a baby girl and in May 2022 of a baby boy.

References

External links
 Nicușor Dan's website
 Salvați Bucureștiul (Save Bucharest) Association
 
 https://www.worldcat.org/identities/viaf-45153124238924490799/

1969 births
Living people
People from Făgăraș
Romanian mathematicians
Romanian political candidates
Romanian activists
Romanian conservationists
University of Bucharest alumni
University of Paris alumni
École Normale Supérieure alumni
International Mathematical Olympiad participants
Members of the Chamber of Deputies (Romania)
Save Romania Union politicians
Mayors of Bucharest
Romanian expatriates in France